Sart is the third album by Norwegian saxophonist Jan Garbarek, his second released on the ECM label, and is performed by Garbarek's quintet featuring Bobo Stenson, Terje Rypdal, Arild Andersen and Jon Christensen.

Reception
The Allmusic review by Brian Olewnick awards the album 4 stars and states, "A strong recording and, along with all of the other early ECM Garbarek releases, recommended for fans who came upon him much later in his career".

Track listing
All compositions by Jan Garbarek except where noted.

 "Sart" – 14:45
 "Fountain of Tears, Parts I & II" – 6:04
 "Song of Space" – 9:39
 "Close Enough for Jazz" (Arild Andersen) – 1:59
 "Irr" – 7:15
 "Lontano" (Terje Rypdal) – 2:10

Personnel
Jan Garbarek – tenor saxophone, bass saxophone, flute
Bobo Stenson – piano, electric piano
Terje Rypdal – guitar
Arild Andersen – bass
Jon Christensen – percussion

References

Jan Garbarek albums
1971 albums
ECM Records albums
Albums produced by Manfred Eicher